Mojinete is a town in Sur Lipez Province in the Potosí Department of southern Bolivia. It is the capital of Mojinete Municipality.

References

External links
 Mojinete Municipality - Map and population data (Spanish) (PDF; 1,09 MB)

Populated places in Potosí Department